This page documents all tornadoes confirmed by various weather forecast offices of the National Weather Service in the United States from May to June 2022. On average, there are 276 confirmed tornadoes in May and 243 in June. Although some moderate outbreaks occurred, May was below average with 237 tornadoes. June was significantly below average with only 122 tornadoes confirmed. The two months broke the above-average trend that had been observed at the beginning of the year.

United States yearly total

May

May 1 event

May 2 event

May 3 event

May 4 event

May 5 event

May 6 event

May 7 event

May 8 event

May 9 event

May 11 event

May 12 event

May 13 event

May 15 event

May 16 event

May 17 event

May 18 event

May 19 event

May 20 event

May 21 event

May 22 event

May 23 event

May 24 event

May 25 event

May 26 event

May 27 event

May 30 event

May 31 event

June

June 3 event

June 4 event

June 5 event

June 6 event

June 7 event

June 8 event

June 9 event

June 10 event

June 11 event

June 12 event

June 13 event

June 14 event

June 15 event

June 16 event

June 17 event

June 19 event

June 20 event

June 21 event

June 23 event

June 24 event

June 25 event

June 26 event

June 30 event

See also
 Tornadoes of 2022
 List of United States tornadoes in April 2022
 List of United States tornadoes from July to October 2022
 List of tornadoes with confirmed satellite tornadoes

Notes

References 

2022-related lists
Tornadoes of 2022
Tornadoes
2022 natural disasters in the United States
Tornadoes in the United States
2022 meteorology